The National Rugby League's Alex McKinnon Cup match is an annual game between the Newcastle Knights and St. George Illawarra Dragons played for on the first occasion the two sides meet in a season. The trophy is named for former player , who suffered a career-ending injury during the 2014 NRL season, leaving him a quadriplegic. 

McKinnon had played for both Newcastle and St. George Illawarra during his career, and the two clubs together instituted the trophy for the 2015 season.

Fixtures & Results

Head To Head

Statistics current as of the conclusion of the 2022 cup game.

See also

Rivalries in the National Rugby League

References

External links
Clubs launch Alex McKinnon Cup
Battle for the Alex McKinnon Cup on Voice for Mining Family Day 🙏

Newcastle Knights matches
St. George Illawarra Dragons matches
Rugby league competitions in New South Wales
Rugby league trophies and awards
Rugby league rivalries
National Rugby League
Rugby league in Sydney
Recurring sporting events established in 2015
2015 establishments in Australia
St. George Illawarra Dragons
Sports rivalries in Australia